The Saab 210 is an approximately 70% scale research prototype for the double-delta configuration of the Saab 35 Draken supersonic fighter. Although never officially named anything but Draken by Saab, it soon became known by its unofficial nickname Lilldraken (Little Dragon) after the first flight of the prototype of the Saab 35. Its first flight was on 21 January 1952.

Design and development

Under designer Erik Bratt, in the early 1950s Saab were developing a double-delta configuration for a proposed supersonic jet fighter. The configuration was novel and highly advanced, so a small aerodynamic test aircraft, the Type 210, was built to investigate its low-speed flight characteristics.

210 or 210A
The tailless double-delta wing extended almost to the front of the 210, with the integral wing root air intakes positioned just behind a small nose. The 210 also featured a protruding bubble canopy, a swept tail fin and semi-retractable tricycle undercarriage. By now the fighter was designated the J 35 Draken and the diminutive test aircraft soon became known as the "Lildraken". Jet power was provided by a 1,000 lb class Armstrong Siddeley Adder engine.

The 210 was taken up for its maiden flight by Bengt Olow, on 21 January 1952. It subsequently undertook extensive flight testing, before undergoing modification for a second phase.

210B
The 210 was modified, with the air intakes moved back to positions alongside the cockpit, in order to increase the field of view for the pilot. A drogue parachute was also added. In this form it was designated the 210B, and the previous configuration retrospectively as the 210A.

Flight testing resumed, and by the time of its last flight on 25 October 1955, the Saab 210 in both its forms had undertaken 887 separate sorties.

The Saab 210B is currently on display in the Flygvapenmuseum (Air Force Museum) in Linköping.

Specifications

See also

References

Notes

Bibliography

 Forsgren, Jan (2010). "Database: Saab J 35 Draken". Aeroplane. May 2010. p.64.
 .

External links

 .

210
1950s Swedish experimental aircraft
Tailless delta-wing aircraft
Single-engined jet aircraft
Aircraft first flown in 1952